Adolphus Frederick VI (17 June 1882 – 23 February 1918) was the last reigning grand duke of Mecklenburg-Strelitz.

Early life
Adolphus Frederick George Ernest Albert Edward of Mecklenburg was born in Neustrelitz, the third child and eldest son of Adolphus Frederick V, Grand Duke of Mecklenburg-Strelitz, and his wife, the former Princess Elisabeth of Anhalt.  He attended a gymnasium school in Dresden and later studied jurisprudence in Munich and served in the Prussian army.  Adolphus Frederick became heir apparent to the Grand Duchy, with the title of Hereditary Grand Duke of Mecklenburg-Strelitz, following the death of his grandfather Grand Duke Frederick William on 30 May 1904.

Adolphus Frederick and his younger brother Duke Karl Borwin are said to have agreed that Adolphus Frederick could devote his life to painting, while Karl Borwin would marry and continue the dynasty; but this agreement could never be realised, as Karl Borwin was killed during a duel with Count George Jametel in 1908.  Adolphus Frederick was subsequently reported to be engaged to various European princesses, including Princess Viktoria Luise of Prussia, the only daughter of the German Emperor William II and his consort, Augusta Victoria of Schleswig-Holstein.

He succeeded as Grand Duke on the death of his father on 11 June 1914, just a few weeks before the outbreak of World War I.  Adolphus Frederick was reported to have married morganatically with attempts made to force him to divorce his wife and conduct an equal marriage, but he was reported to have refused. Recent research has disproven claims that he was the father of the children of operatic soprano Mafalda Salvatini. An Italian by birth but raised mainly in Paris, and a star at the Berlin State Opera and the Deutsche Oper Berlin, Salvatini had been his mistress from 1908 until his suicide in 1918. Her two sons, Charles E. (Horst) Gérard and the theatre production designer and painter Rolf Gérard, were shown not to be illegitimate children of the Grand Duke, though this had been suspected.

Succession crisis and  a possible marriage
With Adolf Friedrich having come to the throne while unmarried and without a male heir there was an issue surrounding the succession as his cousin and heir, Russian based Duke Charles Michael of Mecklenburg-Strelitz (1863–1934) had indicated just before First World War broke out that he wished to renounce his succession rights. If there was no male heir to Mecklenburg-Strelitz the grand duchy would merge with the neighboring Grand Duchy of Mecklenburg-Schwerin. During the war the topic of marriage was discussed by Adolf Friedrich and his friend Daisy, Princess of Pless, however in wartime it was very difficult to arrange a meeting with an eligible princess. Eventually, Daisy identified her husband's relative, Princess Benigna Reuss of Köstritz (1892–1983) as a suitable bride. She was third child and the only daughter of Prince Heinrich XXVIII Reuss of Köstritz (1859–1924) and his first wife, Countess Magdalene of Solms-Laubach (1863–1925). As Adolf Friedrich was agreeable to the match his Minister-President Heinrich Bossart started negotiations with the future bride's family to bring about the marriage. However, before the engagement could be announced there was the complication of a connection to a woman whom Adolf Friedrich needed to be freed from. Rumor has it that the woman in question was Margrit Höllrigl, Countess Bubna of Litic with whom he had a relationship while he was based in Potsdam. Because of this, the previously arranged marriage to Princess Benigna never materialized and after that she never married.

Death
On 23 February 1918 at Neustrelitz, Adolphus Frederick committed suicide.  This left Mecklenburg-Strelitz facing a succession crisis, as the only surviving member of the Strelitz line, Duke Charles Michael of Mecklenburg, had served in the Russian military (in opposition to German and allied forces) and had indicated in 1914 that he wished to renounce his rights to the throne of Mecklenburg-Strelitz; at Adolphus Frederick's request, Charles Michael later agreed to defer any renunciation until the matter arose.  There was also a morganatic male-line relative, Duke Charles Michael's nephew George, Count of Carlow.

Because Charles Michael was in Russia, Grand Duke Friedrich Franz IV of Mecklenburg-Schwerin became regent for Mecklenburg-Strelitz and remained such until the end of the German monarchies in 1918, when the government in Strelitz declared the end of the regency.  Friedrich Franz IV received confirmation from Charles Michael that he wished to renounce his succession rights, although this only arrived in 1919, after the abolition of the monarchies and the establishment of the Free State of Mecklenburg-Strelitz.

Adolphus's fortune had been amassed by his grandfather and was estimated at 30 million marks (€ million in ).  In his will, he left his entire fortune to Friedrich Franz IV of Mecklenburg-Schwerin's second son, Duke Christian Ludwig (1912–1996).  He did this on the condition that Christian agree to become Grand Duke of Mecklenburg-Strelitz and take up residence in Neustrelitz; otherwise the inheritance would be reduced to 3 million marks.

Titles, styles and honours

Titles and styles
17 June 1882 – 30 May 1904: His Highness The Duke Adolphus Frederick of Mecklenburg-Strelitz
30 May 1904 – 11 June 1914: His Royal Highness The Hereditary Grand Duke of Mecklenburg-Strelitz
11 June 1914 – 23 February 1918: His Royal Highness The Grand Duke of Mecklenburg-Strelitz

Honours
He received the following awards:

Ancestors

References

Books

1882 births
1918 suicides
Protestant monarchs
Dukes of Mecklenburg-Strelitz
House of Mecklenburg-Strelitz
People from Neustrelitz
Hereditary Grand Dukes of Mecklenburg-Strelitz
Grand Dukes of Mecklenburg-Strelitz
German landowners
Major generals of Prussia
German people of English descent
German people of French descent
Annulled Honorary Knights Grand Cross of the Royal Victorian Order
Recipients of the Iron Cross (1914), 1st class
Recipients of the Iron Cross (1914), 2nd class
Recipients of the Military Merit Cross (Mecklenburg-Schwerin)
Suicides in Germany